The Acharanga Sutra (First book c. 5th–4th century BCE; Second book c. 2nd–1st century BCE) is the first of the twelve Angas, part of the agamas (religious texts) which were compiled based on the teachings of 24th Jina Mahavira.

The existing text of the Acharanga Sutra which is used by the Svetambara sect of Jainism was recompiled and edited by  KshamaShraman Devardhigani, who headed the  council held at Valabhi c. 454 CE. The Digambaras do not recognize the available text, and regard the original text as having been lost in its original form. The Digambara text, Mulachara is said to be derived from the original Acharanga and discusses the conduct of a Digambara monk.

Introduction
The Acharanga Sutra is the oldest agam, from a linguistic point of view, written in Ardhamagadhi Prakrit. The  Sutra contains two books, or Srutaskandhas. The first book is the older part, to which other treatises were later added. It describes the conduct and behavior of ascetic life: the mode of asking for food, bowl, clothes, conduct while walking and speaking and regulation of possessions by ascetics. It also describes the penance of Mahavira, the Great Hero.

The second book is divided into four sections called Kulas. There were originally five Kûlâs, but the fifth, the Nisîhiyagghana, is now reckoned as a separate work. The first and second parts lay down rules for conduct of ascetics.

The Ācārāṅga has been described in details in Samavāyāṅga and the Nandῑ. According to them, the main studies of the Ācārāṅga are 'Ācāra gocara' i.e. code of conduct, vinaya (humility), vaināyika (fruition of humility), sthāna (difference postures), gamana (travelling), cankramaṇa (movements), bhojana-mātra (quantity of food intake), svādhyāya (spiritual studies), bhāṣā samiti (principles of speech), gupti (restraint or of mind, speech and body), sayyā (place of stay), upādhῑ (belongings) etc. The Ācārāṅga recommends purity of all these aspects. Acharya Umāsvati has briefly dealt with the subject matter of the nine chapters of the Ācārāṅga. They are:

Ṣaḍjῑvanikāya yatanā – self-restraint in respect of the six kinds of living beings.
Abandoning of ego over worldly things.
Conquest over trials and tribulations of life.
Unshakable perception about righteousness.
Detachment towards worldly affairs.
The process to decay or destroy the karmas.
Service towards elders.
Penance and austerities.
Renunciation of attachment to sexual objects

Acharanga sutra quotes:

Monasticism
Acharanga Sutra describes lack of clothes as being in full conformity with Jain doctrine (AS 1.6.2.3). Another passage in the Acharanga refers to the difficulties experienced by naked monk and also to the fact that he does not need to beg for and repair clothes (AS 1.6.3.1–2).

Commentaries
Following are the commentaries on the  Sutra:

Tîkâ of Silanka, also called Tattvâditya, said to have been finished in the  876 CE, with the help of Vâhari Sâdhu.
Dîpikâ of Jinahamsa Sûri, a teacher of the Brihat Kharatara Gakkha.
Pârsvakandra's Bâlâvabodha, generally closely follows the explanation of the older commentaries, more especially that of the Dîpikâ.

Footnotes

References

 

Illustrated SRI ACARANGA SUTRA  (2 volumes), Ed. by Pravartaka Amar Muni, Shrichand Surana Saras, Eng. tr. by Surendra Bothra, Prakrit Gatha — Hindi exposition — English exposition and Appendices

External links
 Text of Akaranga Sutra Translated by Hermann Jacobi

Jain texts
Agamas